The California Commotion is a professional women's softball team based in California. They were founded in 2019 as part of National Pro Fastpitch to be an expansion club for the 2020 National Pro Fastpitch season.

History
Their introduction made them the first West Coast-based team in the league since 2005, when the California Sunbirds left the league. The club plans to prioritize West coach players in their roster. On November 17, 2019, Kirk Walker was named head coach and assistant general manager of the team. The team would not have a home field for the 2020 season, and instead would play games throughout the state, although their main team base would be in Los Angeles.

However, their debut has been delayed indefinitely as the 2020 and 2021 seasons were cancelled due to the COVID-19 pandemic.

References

External links

Softball teams in the United States
Sports teams in California
National Pro Fastpitch teams
2019 establishments in California
Sports clubs established in 2019
Women's sports in California